Club Atlético Rosario Central is a sports club based in Rosario, Argentina, that plays in the Argentine Primera División. The club was officially founded on December 24, 1889, by a group of railway workers, taking its name from the English-owned Central Argentine Railway company. One of the oldest Argentine and Latin American teams, it is considered a pioneer in its hometown and the only one of current Santa Fe province teams to have won an international title organised by CONMEBOL, the Copa Conmebol, won by the club in 1995.

Originally a member of the Rosario's Football Association, the club affiliated itself to the Argentine Football Association (AFA) in 1939. Since then, Rosario Central has won the Argentine Primera Division four times, with the last domestic title won in 1986–87. In addition, Rosario Central won six National cups, with the 2018 Copa Argentina being its most recent achievement. Also, Rosario Central won the Copa CONMEBOL (the precursor of the current Copa Sudamericana) in 1995.
 	
In 2012, the club was considered by FIFA as one of the 11 most classical clubs in Argentine football.

Rosario Central has a strong rivalry with Newell's Old Boys. The matches played between them are named "El Clasico Rosarino", and are amongst the most heated rivalries in Argentina due to Rosario's local popularity. Nowadays Rosario Central has the biggest difference in history between both teams, due to, having 16 winnings more than his eternal rival. That dissimilarity in favor of Rosario Central is kept across 70 years ago. An extraordinary circumstance in the history of the Argentian league, known as "The oldest paternity ever".
Rosario Central's home stadium is Estadio Dr. Lisandro de la Torre, known simply as "El Gigante de Arroyito" (The Giant of Arroyito) is one of the stadiums where Argentinas play in the 78’FIFA World Cup.

History

The beginning

By the end of the 1880s, a group of workers of British–owned company Central Argentine Railway used to play a kind of football game in fields located near Alberdi Avenue in Rosario. In the Christmas eve of 1889 they met at a bar with the purpose of establishing a club. British English citizen Thomas Mutton suggested the name "Central Argentine Railway Athletic Club", which was approved. British Scottish Colin Calder was chosen as first president of the new club.

At the beginning, only CAR employees were admitted as members. The first field was located on a railway's land while a disused wagon served as club's headquarters. The first recorded game was played in 1890 when CARAC played a friendly match v the crew of a British ship's crew, which ended 1–1. A second match between both teams finished with CARAC winning 2–1.

During many years Central Argentine played only internal matches or faced the Rosario Cricket Club (current Club Atlético del Rosario) occasionally. In 1904 the railway companies Central Argentino and Buenos Aires merged, which caused a high number of criollo workers moved to Rosario. They quickly became football enthusiasts so the club increased its number of members to 130 people. During an assembly, executive Miguel Green (also forward of the team) suggested that people outside the railway company could be accepted as member of the club. The proposal was widely discussed until it was finally approved so the statute was modified, including the change of name to Spanish form "Club Atlético Rosario Central". Since those changes were approved, a significative number of workers of the city came to Rosario Central to become members of the club.

Liga Rosarina and National cups
The Liga Rosarina de Football (Rosario's Football League) was created in March 1905. The first tournament organised by the body was the "Copa Santiago Pinasco", named that way because the Mayor of Rosario, Santiago Pinasco, donated the trophy.

Central debuted on May 21, 1905, defeating Rosario A.C. by 3–1. On June, Rosario Central player Zenón Díaz was called for a Rosario combined that played a friendly match v English club Nottingham Forest (that was touring South America). The first official title won by Rosario Central came in 1908, when the squad won the "Copa Nicasio Vila" (the first division of LRF). The team finished unbeaten with 48 goals scored and only 9 conceded. Some notable players were Zenón Díaz, Harry Hayes, Augusto Winn, J.H. Grant, Juan Díaz.

In 1913 the club disaffiliated from the Liga Rosarina, founding with other clubs the dissident "Federación Rosarina de Football". Central won this league in 1913. That same year, Rosario Central won its first national title, the Copa de Competencia La Nación, a domestic cup organised by dissident Federación Argentina de Football. Rosario Central won the competition after defeating Argentino de Quilmes 3–2 in Estadio G.E.B.A. of Buenos Aires.

In 1914 Central would return to Liga Rosarina, winning the championship after playing 20 matches, winning 19 games with 1 draw. The team scored 99 goals and only conceded 10, being Harry Hayes the top scorer of the tournament with 51 goals.

The squad also would win the 1915, 1916 and 1917 regional titles, becoming four-champion of the Rosarian League. In 1919, Central won the Rosario's league title again, winning 3–2 the final match against their history rivals: Newell's Old Boys.

The second national title won by Rosario Central was the Copa Dr. Carlos Ibarguren, a trophy contested by the champions of Buenos Aires and Rosario. Central won the 1915 edition beating Racing Club (that had won three Primera División titles consecutively) 3–1 in the final.

In 1916 Central won the Copa de Honor Municipalidad de Buenos Aires after beating Independiente 1–0. That same year the Rosarino team won the Copa de Competencia Jockey Club defeating Independiente again. A new national title would come in 1920, when Central won the Copa de Competencia organised by dissident body Asociación Amateurs de Football (AAmF) against Sportivo Almagro. During the 1910 decade, Rosario Central won a total of five National cups.

In 1920 Rosario Central left the Rosarian League again, and joined other clubs to establish a dissident league, winning the 1920 and 1921 titles. Two years later, Central and the dissident clubs would return again to the Rosarian league.

In the following years, Central won the 1923, 1927, 1928 (won against Newell's in the final match), and 1930 championship, becoming the most successful team in Liga de Rosario's history.

In 1931 football became professional in Argentina, so a new Association, "Asociación Rosarina de Fútbol", was created in Rosario to organize the first professional championships. The Copa Nicasio Vila changed its name to "Torneo Gobernador Luciano Molinas", honoring then Governor of Santa Fe Province Luciano Molinas. Rosario Central won the 1937 and 1938 titles.

Coming to Primera División

In 1939, Rosario Central and its arch-rival Newell's Old Boys requested Argentine Football Association to be added to the main league championship of Argentina, the Primera División. The Association accepted the requirement therefore both clubs joined the top-flight division of Argentine football.

Despite playing in the Primera División, Rosario Central continue contesting the Rosarian Football Association competitions with reserve teams formed by amateur footballers. During its first year in Primera División, Rosario Central finished 11° with 33 points earned (15 loses).

In 1941 Rosario Central was relegated to the second division, Primera B, after losing 20 matches with only 6 won. Nevertheless, Central only lasted one season in second division, returning one year later, after 25 matches won and only 4 lost. In 1950 Central was relegated again after a poor campaign in Primera. As its precedent relegation, Central promoted to the top division one year after being relegated, so the team returned to Primera in 1951.

First league titles 

Rosario Central won its first national league title, in the 1971 Nacional championship with Angel Labruna as coach defeating San Lorenzo in the final game. Central had previously beat arch-rival Newell's 1–0 in semi-finals with a goal scored by Aldo Poy, who dove to head the ball before it touched the grass (a way of heading popularly known as "palomita" in South America). That goal is still remembered by Central supporters who usually reunite on December 19, to recreate the goal. Many times Poy himself has taken part of the celebration.

The second league title for the club came two years later, winning the 1973 Nacional with Carlos Griguol as coach. Some of the most notable players were Poy, Carlos Aimar and Eduardo Solari. The most frequent line-up was: Carlos Biasutto, Jorge González, Aurelio Pascuttini, Daniel Killer, Mario Killer, Carlos Aimar, Eduardo Solari, Aldo Poy, Ramón Bóveda, Roberto Cabral and Daniel Aricó.

For the 1974 season, Central acquired striker Mario Kempes from Instituto Atlético Central Córdoba (Kempes and Instituto mate Osvaldo Ardiles were to be reunited in the national team that won the 1978 World Cup).

After seven years without titles, Central won the 1980 Nacional with Ángel Tulio Zof on the bench. That team was called La Sinfónica (the Symphony Orchestra) because of the exquisite playing displayed by the team on the field. Central defeated Racing de Córdoba 5–0 in the first final game, and lost 2–0 in the second match but proclaimed champion due to goal average. Daniel Carnevali, Juan Carlos Ghielmetti, Edgardo Bauza, Oscar Craiyacich, Jorge García, José Gaitán, Daniel Sperandío, Eduardo Bacas, Félix Orte, Víctor Marchetti and Daniel Teglia was the frequent line-up on the fields.

After a few years with bad seasons, the team was relegated in 1984, but returned to first division just one year later after winning the Primera B championship, coached by Pedro Marchetta. Central returned to Primera to play the 1986–87 season, winning the title at the end of the tournament but coached by Zof again. This was a first in Argentine football (oddly, Central Español performed a similar feat in Uruguay in the years 1983–84, also a first).

The 1986–87 team was formed by Alejandro Lanari, Hernán Díaz, Jorge Balbis, Edgardo Bauza, Pedernera, Omar Palma, Adelqui Cornaglia, Roberto Gasparini, Osvaldo Escudero, Fernando Lanzidei and Hugo Galloni.

International titles
The first years of the decade of 1990 Central did not make good campaigns in domestic tournaments, although the team won the CONMEBOL Cup (the precursor of the current Copa Sudamericana) in 1995, being the only international title achieved by a Santa Fe Province based team to date. Central defeated Brazilian squad Atlético Mineiro 4–0 in Arroyito after losing by the same score in the first match in Brazil. Finally Central won the Cup by Penalty shoot-out, with a score of 4–3.

The club has participated in eleven editions of the Copa Libertadores, and is currently tied for fifth place with Estudiantes de la Plata and Vélez Sársfield, all of which trail participation leaders Boca Juniors, River Plate, Independiente, and San Lorenzo de Almagro.

Decline and resurrection
After the 2010 Clausura, Rosario Central's poor form over the past three years forced it into a relegation/promotion play-off against Nacional B side All Boys, which won the tie over two legs 4–1 on aggregate (defining the series with a thrashing 3–0 in Arroyito), relegating Rosario Central to Primera B Nacional, the second tier of Argentine football. It was the fourth time the club was relegated to play in the second division.

Rosario Central spent several seasons in the B Nacional until May 19, 2013, when the squad secured the promotion to Primera División after beating Gimnasia y Esgrima de Jujuy by 3–0. The three goals were scored by Javier Toledo. The team was coached by Miguel Ángel Russo.

Uniform

Uniform evolution

Notes

Kit manufacturers and jersey sponsors
Starting in 2022, all the clothing line is provided by Umbro.

Stadium
Rosario Central plays in the Gigante de Arroyito stadium, located in the confluence of Avellaneda Boulevard and Génova Avenue, in the Lisandro de la Torre neighborhood (popularly known as Arroyito), in north-east Rosario. It has an official capacity of 41,654.

The stadium was one of the venues chosen for the 1978 FIFA World Cup. In that tournament, all three-second-round games of the Argentine squad were played in the Gigante. Local hero Kempes enjoyed the support of the fans and went on to become the top scorer of the tournament.

Nicknames
Central's common nickname is canallas ("rabble", "scoundrels", which is a rather mild insult in Argentina) because it is said that the club refused to play a charity match for a leprosy clinic in the 1920s; rival side Newell's acquired the leprosos (lepers) nickname when it did play in that event.

Another version states that in 1928 the Central supporters burned down some canvas near the Club Belgrano stadium (which Central had a strong rivalry). When the Belgrano supporters saw that, they started to shout to them: "You're scoundrels! Scoundrels!".

In a January 2007 press conference presenting the new jersey, Rosario native Roberto Fontanarrosa revised the definition and spelling of Central's nickname. The new spelling he gave was canaya, because according to him, people from the city of Rosario do not use the Spanish word canalla for any other reason than referring to the club.

Central is also known as La Academia (like the fellow Argentine team Racing Club) due to the number of players that become professional from the youth teams; but also to the number of consecutive titles that the club won in the Rosario's League (at an amateur level), in comparison to what Racing Club did in the Buenos Aires' League.

Supporters

Rosario Central's supporters are considered one of the most significant of Argentina.
The Newspaper Olé was published last January 5, 2008 by a recent study realized by the English magazine UK Football. The same one, published that a ranking with the 50 most vibrant supporters of the world. The results were the following ones: as first, Milan represents the supporters of the AC, then that of Real Madrid, and third that of the Galatasaray of Turkey. Between the Argentinians that of Rosario Central turns out to be like first in the position 14, second that of River Plate in the position 20, third turn out to be the supporters of Boca Juniors in 23, and fourth that of Racing Club in the place number 48.
It is provided also with certain proper rituals, as being the " Throwing of Towel ", on November 23 in recognition to the party that Rosario Central imposed on his rival for 4 on 0 and this one was considered finished to 11 minutes of the second half, is known as the day of the abandonment, or the celebration of the " Day of the Friend Canaya ", which is celebrated on July 19 (date of death of Roberto Fontanarrosa) and the most important, the celebration of the Little dove of Poy, who celebrates all on December 19 in different cities of the world, raised an order so that between to the book Guinness as the most celebrated goal of the history

In popular culture
Rosario Central has featured in many films, books, songs and plays. The club has also featured on several occasions in prose. Roberto Fontanarrosa's story 19 de diciembre de 1971 is about a fan who travels to Buenos Aires for a Semi-final match against Newell's Old Boys.

Celebrity fans include Alberto "El Negro" Olmedo, Rita la Salvaje, Libertad Lamarque, some writers such as Osvaldo Bayer and Roberto Fontanarrosa, and some musicians as well as Fito Páez, Juan Carlos Baglietto, Joaquín Sabina are all fans of the club.

Ernesto "Che" Guevara, a major figure of the Cuban Revolution, was a Rosario Central fan.

Players

Current squad
.

Out on loan

Individual records

Top scorers

Notes

Former players

Managers

 György Orth (1945)
 Hugo Bagnulo (1965)
 Manuel Giúdice (1966)
 Omar Sívori (1969–70)
 Ángel Tulio Zof (1970–71)
 Carlos Timoteo Griguol (1971), (1971)
 Ángel Labruna (1971–72)
 Ángel Tulio Zof (1972–73)
 Carlos Timoteo Griguol (1973–75)
 José Ricardo De León (1975)
 José María Silvero (1976)
 Alfio Basile (1976)
 Carlos Timoteo Griguol (1977–78)
 Ángel Tulio Zof (1979)
 Roberto Saporiti (1980)
 Ángel Tulio Zof (1980–82), (1982)
 Aurelio Pascuttini (1984)
 Ángel Tulio Zof (1986–87), (1987–90), (1991)
 Vicente Cantatore (1993)
 Ángel Tulio Zof (1995)
 Juan José López (interim) (1995–96)
 Ángel Tulio Zof (1996–97)
 Miguel Ángel Russo (1997–98)
 Edgardo Bauza (1998–01)
 Juan José López (2001–02)
 César Luis Menotti (July 1, 2002 – 15 Nov 2)
 Miguel Ángel Russo (2002–04)
 Hugo Galloni (2004)
 Víctor Púa (July 1, 2004 – 23 Aug 4)
 Ángel Tulio Zof (2004), (2005), (2005–06)
 Hugo Galloni (2006)
 Carlos Ischia (March 26, 2007 – 23 Oct 7)
 Leonardo Madelón (July 1, 2007 – 30 June 8)
 Pablo Sánchez (July 1, 2008 – 5 Oct 8)
 Gustavo Alfaro (Oct 10, 2008 – 2 March 9)
 Reinaldo Merlo (March 2, 2009 – 14 May 9)
 Miguel Ángel Russo (April 17, 2009 – 13 July 2009)
 Leonardo Madelón (March 28, 2010 – 30 June 10)
 Reinaldo Merlo (July 5, 2010 – 24 Oct 10)
 Héctor Rivoira (Oct 24, 2010 – 28 March 11)
 Omar Palma (March 29, 2011 – 30 June 11)
 Juan Antonio Pizzi (July 1, 2011 – 5 July 12)
 Miguel Ángel Russo (6 July 2012–14)
 Hugo Galloni (2014)
 Eduardo Coudet (2015–2016)
 Paolo Montero (2017)
 Leonardo Fernández (2017–2018)
 Edgardo Bauza (2018–2019)
 Diego Cocca (2019–2020)
 Kily González (2020–2022)
 Carlos Tevez (2022)
 Miguel Ángel Russo (2023–)

Honours

National

Leagues
Primera División (4): 1971 Nacional, 1973 Nacional, 1980 Nacional, 1986–87
Primera B Nacional (1): 2012–13
Primera B (3): 1942, 1951, 1985

Cups
Copa de Competencia La Nación (FAF) (1): 1913 
Copa Ibarguren (1): 1915
Copa de Honor MCBA (1): 1916
Copa de Competencia Jockey Club (1): 1916
Copa de Competencia (AAmF) (1): 1920
Copa Argentina (1): 2018

International
Copa Conmebol (1): 1995

Regional
 Liga Rosarina:
 Copa Nicasio Vila (10): 1908, 1914, 1915, 1916, 1917, 1919, 1923, 1927, 1928, 1930
 Copa Estímulo (1): 1922
 Federación Rosarina (1): 1913 
 Asociación Amateurs Rosarina (2): 1920, 1921 
 Asociación Rosarina de Fútbol:
 Torneo Luciano Molinas (2): 1937, 1938 
 Torneo Preparación (1): 1936 
 Torneo Hermenegildo Ivancich (1): 1937 
Federación Santafersina de Fútbol:
Copa Santa Fe (1): 2017 

Notes

References

External links

  
 de Rosario y de Central

 
Association football clubs established in 1889
Basketball teams in Argentina
1889 establishments in Argentina
Football clubs in Rosario, Santa Fe
Sports clubs in Rosario
Field hockey clubs in Rosario, Santa Fe
Railway association football teams
Copa CONMEBOL winning clubs